Birinus is a monotypic snout moth genus. Its only species, Birinus russeolus, is found in Guyana. Both the genus and species were described by Carl Heinrich in 1956.

References

Phycitinae
Moths of South America
Endemic fauna of Guyana
Moths described in 1956